DJMax (Korean: 디제이맥스, dijeimaegseu) is an action-rhythm video game series created by Neowiz MUCA. Games feature mostly experimental music and visual art from Korean DJs, artists and composers. Known South Korean experimental group Clazziquai Project has also made songs for the series. There are also a few Japanese composers who have given significant contributions to the series.

Release history

The first game in the series, DJMax Online, started on June 13, 2004 (closed alpha test) as a web based service for the Windows platform. It was only accessible from Korea, Japan and China. Since then, Pentavision has developed and published seven DJMax games mostly for the PlayStation Portable under the title DJMax Portable.

Pentavision released an offline DJMax game for Windows under the title DJMax Trilogy on December 25, 2008. Trilogy is a compilation of songs from three earlier games (DJMax Online, DJMax Portable and DJMax Portable 2) and it was created to replace DJMax Online, which was taken offline on March 21, 2008. Pentavision worked together with Korean company Gammac to manufacture a special DJ controller for the game which was then bundled together with the limited edition. The controller became widely available outside the Limited Edition a few months later.

Pentavision announced an arcade music game named DJMax Technika on December 31, 2008. It features a new way of playing via a bottom 22-inch touch screen. It was followed by DJMax Technika 2, which was released on March 4, 2010. DJMax Technika 3 was released in Korea on October 27, 2011.

United States-based developer PM Studios officially announced on May 25, 2010 that DJMax Portable 3 would be released in North America. It was officially released October 14, 2010 on UMD and on October 19, 2010 on PlayStation Network.

Tap Sonic is a spin-off of the DJMax series for the iOS and Android mobile platforms by Neowiz Internet in partnership with Pentavision.

DJMax Technika Tune was announced on March 13, 2012 for release on the PlayStation Vita. It was released in 2012 in Korea, Japan and the USA. It features similar touch-based gameplay as in the Technika arcade series.

Gameplay

DJMax Portable and DJMax Trilogy
The main gameplay is formed around the simple idea that the player must press various buttons at the correct moment, which is indicated by the music and the notes which scroll down in a tune of the music track visualized on screen. Hitting the correct notes fills in the missing instruments from the melody and gives player points. The player receives percentage per note which tells how close to player was from hitting the note exactly right moment. It ranges from 1–100% and player receives points from the notes accordingly. Hitting all of the notes gives a player 96.9% of the points gainable from the song.

If the player keeps hitting notes at the correct moment, the player also receives Combo points and the DJ Fever gauge gradually fills up. Combo is an additional multiplier used to get maximum points from the song. Fever is used to maximize Combo points. If the player misses even one note during a Combo, this counter is the reduced to zero and counting begins again from first correct note. The player gains additional Combo points by activating DJ Fever when it has charged fully. It speeds up the game and makes it harder to hit the correct notes but it also allows player to get a much higher Combo value. The objective of the game is to hit all notes with 100% accuracy, gaining full Combo and activating DJ Fever as many times as it is possible to during the song to maximize Combo points which are used to maximize points from the song.

There are various types of difficulty settings in this game, and specifics vary from game to game. Usually there are at least Arcade, Mission and Freestyle options available. During Arcade and Freestyle, the player has the option of choosing which button layout to follow. Button layouts scale from just two buttons up to a maximum of eight buttons. Which button layouts are available for the player depends on the type of game. For example, original DJMax Portable features button layouts 4B, 6B and 8B, while DJMax Portable 2 features button layouts 4B, 5B, 6B and 8B. Button layouts offer first selection of difficulty for player. 4B being the easy mode and 8B being hard mode. Every song in the DJMax Portable series and Trilogy has a rating which indicates the difficulty of the song. Some songs are available in more difficult formats. For example, the player can try to play an 8B song fitted for a 6B layout. These are marked usually with HD (Hard), MX (Maximum) or SC (Super Crazy) as opposed to NM (Normal) of the 6B layout default difficulty. It significantly increases difficulty from the 6B NM mode when player plays 6B MX instead. It allows player to have higher score in 6B layout mode.

The gameplay also opens new game modes, songs, styles, additional content like music videos or backgrounds for player as player progresses and gains experience points which determine the level of the player.

Arcade mode
In Arcade mode, the player has to pass stages. There are usually three or four stages in Arcade mode depending on the game. For example, in DJMax Portable 2, the player has to pass four stages but in DJMax Portable 3, the player only needs to pass three. Stages consist usually of a limited selections of songs. In the first stages, the songs feature a lower rating than the songs in the later stages. When the player passes the stage, the player receives a grade ranging from F to A+ in most games. When the player has passed all the stages, scores from the stages are combined and presented to the player with statistics about the player's success. After passing the Arcade mode, the player usually sees a small "Thanks for playing DJMAX" video clip. The objective of this mode is to get the highest score. In some games the player can compete against others by submitting his or her score to an online ranking system by using password codes that DJMax generates.

Freestyle mode
Freestyle is a mode where any unlocked song can be played individually. Additionally, the combo counter is persistent throughout all song plays meaning the player can get an 'infinite" combo.

Mission mode
Mission game mode, which is also known as XC (Extreme Challenge) mode in some DJMax games, features pre-selected sets of songs with certain challenges. These are explained in a mission briefing when selecting a mission. These challenges can be for example achieving a certain number of points, a certain score multiplier, a certain accuracy, not breaking the combo more than what is allowed, or achieving a certain combo. These challenges can be combined. For example, in DJMax Portable 2 there is a challenge called "Rock n' Night", which states that player has to use DJ Fever at least once, two times in a row, on every pre-selected stage of the mission and that player also has to exceed combo of 2000 notes. If the player is able to pass the mission, then the game rewards player with additional items like new characters and new gear & note styles.

REMIX SYSTEM mode
The DJMax Portable 3 introduced a new game mode known as REMIX SYSTEM. It features game modes 3.2T, 4.2T and 6.2T which add two additional tracks for players to follow. The player uses the PSP's analog stick to move active track to be either left or right, default position being center. These additional tracks only feature three lines so player only has to press the square, triangle and circle buttons while moving the analog stick correspondingly to hit the notes. The trick is that player has to follow the active track and changes can come fast.

DJMax Technika
In this arcade series (which also has one entry for the PlayStation Vita and mobile platforms), players have to tap the screen at the moment when a moving slider crosses the symbols. Tapping the correct symbols produce sounds which fills in the missing sounds from the song and gives players points. There are different kinds of hand gestures or motions player needs to perform at times.

Intellectual property disputes
Due to the comparable similarity between DJMAX games and the Beatmania series, including the interface and keysounding implementation, Pentavision received an intellectual property infringement filing from Konami on December 24, 2008. The lawsuit was settled out of court, with Konami owning exclusive distribution rights to DJMAX games in Japan, as well as Pentavision being required to pay a fee for any future DJMAX games released.

Released games

References

External links
 Pentavision
 DJMAX Official site
 DJMAX Portable
 DJMAX Portable 2
 DJMAX Portable Clazziquai Edition
 DJMAX Portable Black Square
 DJMAX Technika
 DJMAX Platinum Crew – Korea
 DJMAX Platinum Crew – USA
 DJMAX Trilogy
 DJMAX Respect

Music video games
Multiplayer online games
Turntable video games
Video games developed in South Korea